Schizophonic is a jazz album by Robben Ford, released in 1976. The album title refers to Robben Ford's interest in playing two instruments. He began playing saxophone at the age of ten, but at thirteen he heard blues guitarist Mike Bloomfield. The music is a mix between different styles of jazz. From Blues in the first track, alongside Latin to more Jazz fusion as known from his later album The Inside Story. On the first track and the last track Robben Ford plays the saxophone.

Track listing
All tracks composed by Robben Ford
 "Miss Miss" – 6:34
 "Ladies' Choice" – 6:30
 "Hawk's Theme" – 5:37
 "Low Ride" – 2:26
 "Stella and Frenchie" – 8:00
 "Softly Rolling" – 7:28

Personnel
 Robben Ford – guitar, saxophone
 Paul Nagle  – keyboards
 Stan Poplin – bass
 Jim Baum – drums
Production
Chris Hudson – production, engineering
Ken Perry, Chris Clarke – mastering

References

Robben Ford albums
1976 albums
Bertelsmann Music Group albums